Juan Carlos Caizapanta (Amaruk Caizapanta Anchapacxi) (Quito, January 30, 1970), whose stage name is Amaruk is an Ecuadorian multidisciplinary artist, known in Spain and Ecuador for his artistic and humanistic trajectory towards Human Rights of Immigrants in Spain. Named as the "Chasqui de Oro" (In the VI Race and hike El Chasqui-NY). Received the award as "Cultural Ambassador of the Andes-Mushuk Nina 2014 (Third Edition)". His Philosophy "Amawtica Amarukiana Desestructuration" brings to the contemporary world the Philosophical study of the Andean Worldview, a spiritual legacy of transformation and balance for the awakening of a collective conscience.

Working with the Catalan Director Ventura Pons, in the film produced by Films de la Rambla, was the key that helped him open all doors and as a Latin American actor to enter the market Audiovisual Spanish. He has filmed as a minor actor and linguistic translator for Apache Films, in a film directed by Agustín Díaz Yanes (winner of two Goyas), based on the book of Arturo Pérez-Reverte "Gold (2016)". As a secondary actor he joins a character of weight in the production "The Invisible Guardian", produced by Atresmedia Cinema with Peter Nadermann, responsible for the film adaptations of the Stieg Larsson trilogy and Nostromo Pictures; Producers of Buried, Red lights, Grand Piano or the mentioned Palm Trees in the Snow, directed by Fernando González Molina.

Biography 
Amaruk, a name that symbolises the sovereign serpent for indigenous peoples, was born on January 30, 1970. He is an Indigenous Kichwa from Chinchay Suyu, nowadays known as Ecuador. He was born in the Tawantinsuyo (which means "the 4 parts of the world", which is today misnamed America), geographically described as South America. The Tungurahua Province of the Indigenous peoples Salasaca Community where Amaruk comes from it is the oldest in Ecuador, pure in its ancient ancestral traditions. One day a Korean family came to his community, the father of this Korean family introduced him the Martial Arts and Performing Arts at the age of 7, he was then a child restless for Sport and the Arts. At the age of 9, he started Martial Arts training with Professor Jorge Narváez Narváez. He has lived in Salasaca until he was 12 years old, where he only spoke the Kichwa language, then he emigrated to Quito and settled there in the most popular neighbourhood, in the south of the city, in Pintado, Calzado, La Magdalena, Quito and Tejar, until the age of 14. At the age of 17 due to professional reasons and in order to seek a better future, he left Ecuador with a suitcase full of dreams and moved to New York City (USA), transforming his life into an eternal pilgrimage to learn, work and spread the millennial culture of his ancestors.

Amaruk graduated as a cinematographic and theatrical artist, in New York, Munich and Seoul, refining his acting skills and movie directing skills in Cuba, in the city of San Antonio de Los Baños, in the International Film and Television School founded by Gabriel García Márquez, where he specialised in Cinematographic Direction. Most of his career was developed in other Spanish cities such as Madrid and Barcelona, where he has lived since 1997. He worked as a Professor of Cinematographic Direction and as Professor of Dramatic Art at the Academy of Cinematography and Audiovisual of the Brothers Almodóvar "15 de Octubre" in Spain. On his arrival, Amaruk started his professional career as Journalist thanks to his notable talent for writing and the desire to go after the news of global interest, for the group of Latin Americans residing in Spain. During his lifetime commitment to Human Rights and the Preservation of the Environment, he was invited to the "Third International Conference for the Equilibrium of the World" as a Lecturer and Journalist for The Unesco and the Embassy of Cuba (2012).

In July 2016 he was interviewed by Lic. Evaristo Villar for the Christian Networks of the Utopia Magazine, in order to learn about his indigenous roots as Amauta, during a visit to the Pope in Poland, in the XXX World Youth Day 2016.

It combines works of risk along with Movie characters interpretation, theatre workshops and TV series.

He is a Master of Mixed Martial Arts and Taekwondo (Black Belt 5th Dan WTF), in Barcelona (Spain). He has lived in 8 countries and has travelled across more than 47 countries due to his journalistic work, making him a World Citizen. He currently resides in Barcelona and Madrid where he has been living for 25 years.

Philosophy Amawtica Amarukiana Desestructuration  
Amaruk Kayshapanta is the creator of this Philosophy. The "Amawtica Amarukiana Desestructuration" was born for the service of humanity as a legacy of the Indigenous Nations of the Andes. It is the philosophical study of the Cosmovision of the Andes, spiritual legacy of transformation and balance that leads us urgently to an awakening of consciousness. This ancestral and millennial philosophy was born in the Andes, thanks to civilizations that have been silenced throughout history and that today will help humanity by unreservedly leading them to the most hidden depths of the human soul, through spirituality; Art based on the preservation of mother earth and its living beings that coexist with man, where the awakening of consciousness will be its most direct link to the universal happiness of all.

Amawtismo: is the harmonious and spiritual connection of the human being with the Universe. Let's start by discovering the meaning of Amauta: In the Andes, Amauta is a BEING of wisdom and medicine, who leads the paths of energy vibrational spirituality of the universe, is a link between RUNA (human being) and Pachamama (Nature), other beings and energies that coexist in duality.

A Being of wisdom: because he has understood the movement and relation of time and space, he has discovered the essence of Andean philosophical thought and that compendium of knowledge and knowledge as a catalyst, shares them.

A Being of medicine: because he has found medicine in himself, in his spiritual and ritual body to offer it to his physical body, connecting with the plants. Healing energies, once the being has found its internal medicine and can heal itself, will have the power to heal other beings.

According to the Peruvian comunero Javier Lajo in his publication "Qhapaq Kuna" in 2002: "Through that dynamic and natural symbol (Andean worship to water) expressing the general law of movement and time, I have been able to learn as much or more than in all the time I have attended school and university". The Amauta is formed by sharing, loving and assisting the Pachamama (nature) and their coexisting energies. Amawtismo (destroy, recycle and rebuild everything in a dual way, loving everything that is plant, animal or thing).

Filmography

Television

 Ecuadorians in the World (2012)
 Immigrants in the World (2012)
 Family – Chulo (2012)
 La Fuga – Carioco (2012)
 Águila Roja – Maya Indian chief (2011)
 Aida – (2009)
 Hospital Central - Edgar (2008)
 The Color of the City – Omar (2006)
 Karakia (2004)
 Dawns – teacher of oriental therapies (2002)

Cinema

 The Invisible Guardian (2017)
 Gold (2016)
 Third Degree (2013)
 Save Lives (2013)
 The Last Pill (2012)
 The Wedding (2012)
 Urban Streets (2010)
 Russian Dolls (2010)
 Death (2010)
 El Pincho (2008)
 Ayawaska (2008)
 Wounded Animals (2006)
 The Cheetah Girl 2 (2006)
 The Enigma of the Spy (2006)
 Friend (2001)

Other Activities

Writing 
Has written books like:

 Ancestral Vision.
 Written Word.
 Dialogues of the Condor with the Eagle.
 Manual of the Martial Arts.
 Memories of a Mitimae.
 The Secret of the Amawtas.

Theater 

 Masks (2013)
 Mom is crazy or possessed (2010)
 La Roka (2009)
 Let me kill you to see if I miss (2007)
 America the New World (2004)

Awards and Recognitions 

 100 Most Relevant Latinos 2013 Award.

References

External links 
 Fuenteovejuna-Teatro Juventud de Hospitalet de Llobregat-Un Pueblo de Leyenda.
  El Comercio
  Ocio Latino
  "Aguila Roja"

Spanish writers
1970 births
Living people